Marc Messier, M.S.C. (born August 16, 1947) is a Canadian actor and filmmaker.

Background
Born in Granby, Quebec, Messier's 45-year acting career included the participation in several well-known films and television series.

After finishing his studies and developed his acting skills in college, he played in various theatrical shows across the province of Quebec plays including "Broue". It was in 1972, that he debuted his acting career in La Vie Rêvée and would make his first appearance in a television series in 1974 in Avec le temps.

Messier's most extensive role was in the two-decade old television series Lance et Compte in which he played the role of Marc Gagnon, an all-star hockey player for the fictional NHL team of the Quebec National, a copycat version of the defunct Quebec Nordiques (now Colorado Avalanche). After his retirement, Gagnon went on to coach the team during two separate; the first starting during the second season and again during the fourth season of the  called : Lance et Compte : Nouvelle generation. Messier played the role of Gagnon for the series six seasons from 1986 to the latest one in 2015 called Lance et Compte : La finale.

Messier also played the role of Bob in all four chapters of the popular Quebec film Les Boys, the story of a hockey team from a senior's league.

He also played roles in other important films such as Jesus of Montreal and Le Sphinx and television series such as Les Voisins, La Petite Vie, Omertà and Urgence.

In addition to playing a role in the film Le Sphinx which played in 1995, he also co-produced it with Les Boys producer Louis Saia. Messier played in several other movies that was produced by Saia during his lengthy career.

Selected filmography

Cinema

TV

Awards
Messier's most productive year was in 1988 in which he won two Gemini awards for best lead male role and best male supporting role for his participation in Lance et Compte and Les Voisins. His role in Les Boys also gave nominations for best male actor in the Jutras awards in 1999 and 2002.

Messier was awarded with the Meritorious Service Cross with the Canada Day honours list of 2017. The citation reads "Having earned a Guinness World Record in 2006 for the longest-running theatrical play with the same cast, Michel Côté, Marcel Gauthier and Marc Messier are undisputed ambassadors of Quebec theatre. With over 3 300 performances of Broue, a one-of-a-kind play reflecting Quebec popular culture, they have made us laugh and have introduced an entire generation to the wonderful world of theatre."

References

External links
 Biography of Marc Messier
 

1947 births
Living people
Male actors from Quebec
Canadian male film actors
Canadian male television actors
French Quebecers
People from Granby, Quebec